Nicolas Métru (ca. 1610 in Bar-sur-Aube1668 Paris) was a French organist, viol player, and composer of pieces for viol and airs. From 1642 he was organist at St. Nicolas-des-Champs, then some time later master of music for the Jesuits. He taught Couperin and Lully and was an outstanding viol player.

His first publication - which survives - was a collection of laudatory airs to verse by Guillaume de Baïf, a minor poet but son of Jean-Antoine de Baïf, for the victorious return of Louis XIII to Paris in 1628 after the end of the 14-month siege of Protestant La Rochelle. His third collection of airs also contains laudatory texts, for the marriage of Louis XIV.

His duets for two viols (Paris, 1642) are the first printed example, and therefore probably antedate the duets of Sainte-Colombe. His fantasias for viols, as those of Henry and Moulinié, derive from the air de cour and the dance rather than older styles. His 1642 publication reflects the change in development of the viol in the 1630-1650s with the upper parts being written with the new smaller viols in mind.

Works, editions and recordings
Works
Recueil des vers du Sr. G. de Baïf, mis en musique par N. Métru, chantez en l'alégresse de l'heureux retour du roy, Paris, 1628
Fantaisies, a 2 viole, Paris, 1642
Premier livre d'airs Paris 1646, - lost
Deuxième livre d’airs, Paris, 1646
Troisième livre d'airs, Paris, 1661
Missa ad imitationem moduli Brevis oratio, Paris, 1663
Contrafacta, 1632

Editions
The CMBV have prepared editions of his duets.

Recordings
 Neufiesme Fantaisie on Orpheus, Ensemble L'Amoroso, Sou GuiBalestraccio. Zig Zag, 2008

References

Sources 
Jean-Paul C. Montagnier, The Polyphonic Mass in France, 1600-1780: The Evidence of the Printed Choirbooks, Cambridge: Cambridge University Press, 2017.

1610s births
1668 deaths
People from Bar-sur-Aube
French Baroque viol players
French Baroque composers
French male classical composers
17th-century classical composers
17th-century male musicians